

The Meyers MAC-125 is a light sport aircraft developed in the United States in 1947, produced in a small series as the MAC-145.

Design and development
The basic design, common to both models, was that of a low-wing cantilever monoplane of all-metal construction with side-by-side seating for two in a fully enclosed cabin. The main gear wheels of the undercarriage were retractable, and the tailwheel was steerable. The aircraft structure incorporated a framework built up of welded steel tube which extended lengthwise from the engine firewall to the rear of the cabin, and spanwise from one undercarriage well to the other. Around this framework was a conventional, monocoque fuselage. The MAC-125 was powered by a single 125-hp engine while the MAC-145 production model had a 145-hp engine instead and a larger tail fin.

The first prototype was lost during spin testing for certification while being flown by Al Meyers. Meyers parachuted to safety, sustaining a broken ankle, and although the aircraft was destroyed, its steel inner structure was salvaged and used to build the second prototype. Certification was subsequently successfully achieved with this aircraft.

Production and operations

Only twenty MAC-145s were built, each to a specific customer order, a business strategy that insulated the Meyers company from the poor market conditions that bankrupted many small American aircraft manufacturers in the late 1940s. Production continued until 1955 when the larger, 4-seat Meyers 200 was certified and began production. The Meyers Aircraft Company was acquired by the Aero Commander division of Rockwell International in 1965.  The type was never produced by Rockwell, and the design again changed hands as part of the Meyers package when sold to Interceptor Corporation in 1968 and subsequently to Prop-Jets Inc in 1982.

The MAC-145 type certificate was subsequently acquired by the Seminole Tribe of Florida, who flew a highly modified version of the design in 1997 as the Micco SP-20.

Examples of Meyers-built MAC-145s are still active in 2011.

Variants
 MAC-125 - prototypes with Continental C125 engine (2 built)
 MAC-145 - production version with Continental C145 engine (20 built)

Specifications (MAC-145)

See also

Notes

References

External links

 Meyers "145" – Flying

1940s United States sport aircraft
MAC-145
Single-engined tractor aircraft
Low-wing aircraft
Aircraft first flown in 1947